Grant v Torstar Corp, is a 2009 Supreme Court of Canada decision on the defences to the tort of defamation. The Supreme Court ruled that the law of defamation should give way to the rights of a party to speak on matters of public interest, provided the party exercises a certain level of responsibility in verifying the potentially defamatory facts. This decision recognizes a defence of responsible communication on matters of public interest.

Background
The Toronto Star newspaper published a story concerning the proposed expansion of the Frog's Breath private golf course, built on a property owned by the plaintiff, Peter Grant, that was located on the shore of Twin Lakes near New Liskeard, Ontario.
The story contained comments from local residents that were critical of Grant, alleging that he was using his political influence to gain permission to expand the golf course from three holes to nine holes.
In particular, one resident claimed that the decision to allow the golf course was a "done deal". Prior to publication, the newspaper contacted Grant for comment, but he declined.
After the article was published, Grant sued the newspaper's parent company Torstar Corporation for defamation.

The courts below

Trial court

Torstar argued that the paper presented the concerns of local residents without making any claims of impropriety by Grant, as well as "an expanded qualified privilege defence based on a concept of public interest responsible journalism."
The Court did not allow the defence of responsible journalism to be considered by the jury, leaving it to determine whether the Star engaged in "fair comment".  The instructions to the jury, however, stated that the defendants would be guilty if the comment would not be held by a "fair-minded" person. The jury found the defendants guilty of libel, and awarded general, aggravated, and punitive damages in the amount of $1.475 million.

Court of Appeal for Ontario
Torstar appealed to the Court of Appeal for Ontario. On the issue of responsible journalism, the Court of Appeal found that the trial court erred in not allowing the jury to consider the defence, and remanded the case for a new trial. The Court also found that the idea of a "fair-minded" person would need to believe in a comment was previously rejected by the court, thus the trial court did not properly instruct the jury on this issue. Finally, the Court found that the defamatory comments in the article were attributed to a resident, and unless the defendants had adopted them as their own, the defendants' "honest belief" in them was irrelevant.

Supreme Court of Canada ruling
Grant appealed to the Supreme Court of Canada. The court dismissed the appeal and the cross-appeal, with only Justice Abella dissenting in part from the decision.

The Court first recognized that the tort of defamation places limits on freedom of expression guaranteed under section 2(b) of the Charter of Rights and Freedoms, but that limit should not go as far as to place a "chill" on expression.

It then determined that four issues needed to be resolved:

Should the common law provide a defence based on responsible communication in the public interest?
If so, what are the elements of the new defence?
If so, what procedures should apply? In particular, what are the respective roles of the judge and jury?
Application to the case at bar
 Fair comment
 Responsible communication

Responsible communication defence
Speaking for the majority, Chief Justice McLachlin found that the defence should exist so as to not restrict speech.  She found that the defence helped to strike the proper balance between rights of free expression, as protected in the Charter, and the rights of privacy and protection of reputation.  She also found justification in the ruling supported by the emerging recognition given to the defence in other common law states.

Elements of the defence
First, McLachlin stated that the defence of responsible communication was a new defence, and not a modification of qualified privilege. She then ruled that defence should be known as "responsible communication", as it is not only journalists who should benefit from the defence, but bloggers and other people who disseminate information regardless of their status in established media.

McLachlin found that two conditions must be met for the defence of responsible communication to apply:
The matter must be one of public interest.
The defendant must show that he acted responsibly, in that he showed diligence in attempting to verify the allegedly defamatory comments, having regard to the totality of the circumstances.

In determining whether the defendant acted responsibly, she found a court should consider:
The seriousness of the allegation
The public importance of the matter
The urgency of the matter
The status and reliability of the source
Whether the plaintiff's side of the story was sought and accurately reported
Whether inclusion of the defamatory statement was justifiable
Whether the defamatory statement's public interest lay in the fact that it was made rather than its truth ("Reportage")
She noted that this list was not exhaustive, but served merely as a guideline.  A court is free to consider other factors as well. As well, the factors should not all be given equal weight.

Roles of judge and jury
McLachlin ruled that the judge is to determine whether the matter is one of public interest. Recognizing that this may involve factual determination, she nonetheless ruled that the judge was serving as a sort of "gatekeeper" in determining whether the defence should be allowed.

The jury was left the role to determine whether a particular defamatory statement was needed to determine whether a defendant acted responsibly when he published it.

Application
McLachlin ruled that the three defences of justification, fair comment, and responsible communication should have been left to a jury.  As a result, she remanded the case for a new trial.

Dissent
Justice Abella concurred in part and dissented in part. She agreed with the majority ruling that a defence of "responsible communication" should be available in Canadian defamation law. However, she dissented as to the division of roles between the judge and the jury. In her opinion, the inquiry as to the availability of the defence was for the judge alone.

Aftermath 
The Supreme Court decision was a landmark decision in Canadian libel law.

By the time the case was decided by the Supreme Court, Peter Grant's company, Grant Forest Products, had gone into bankruptcy protection as a result of the downturn in the American housing market during the subprime mortgage crisis. Since the property at issue in this case was owned by the company, it was put up for sale to pay off Grant Forest Products's creditors.

See also
 
 List of Supreme Court of Canada cases (McLachlin Court)
 New York Times Co v Sullivan, 376 US 254, a similar case in the United States whose broad grant of free speech has been rejected by the Canadian courts.
 Reynolds v Times Newspapers Ltd, [1999] 4 All ER 609, a similar case in the United Kingdom
 Dean Jobb, The Responsible Journalism Defence: What's in it for Journalists?  J-Source: The Canadian Journalism Project

References

Canadian defamation case law
Supreme Court of Canada cases
2009 in Canadian case law
Toronto Star